Kacem Slimani (1 July 1948 – 30 November 1996) was a Moroccan football defender who played for Morocco in the 1970 FIFA World Cup. He also played for RS Settat and Paris FC. Also, Slimani was a municipal employee.

References

1948 births
1996 deaths
Moroccan footballers
Moroccan expatriate footballers
Morocco international footballers
Association football defenders
RS Settat players
Paris FC players
1970 FIFA World Cup players
Competitors at the 1967 Mediterranean Games
People from Settat
Botola players
Ligue 1 players
Expatriate footballers in France
Moroccan expatriate sportspeople in France
Mediterranean Games competitors for Morocco